Banque Cantonale du Jura is a Swiss cantonal bank which is part of the 24 cantonal banks serving Switzerland's 26 cantons.  Founded in 1979, Banque Cantonale du Jura in 2014 had 12 branches across Switzerland with 120 employees; total assets of the bank were 2 575.00 mln CHF. Banque Cantonale du Jura has full state guarantee of its liabilities.

Notes and references

See also 
 Cantonal bank
 List of banks in Switzerland

External links 
 

Jura
Companies listed on the SIX Swiss Exchange